Jaya Bachchan (née Bhaduri; born 9 April 1948) is an Indian actress and politician. She is a member of Parliament in the Rajya Sabha from the Samajwadi Party, serving four terms since 2004. Known primarily for her work in Hindi and Bengali cinema, she is noted for reinforcing a natural style of acting in both mainstream and "middle-of-the-road" cinema. She has received several accolades, including nine Filmfare Awards and the Padma Shri, the fourth-highest civilian honour awarded by the Government of India.

Making her film debut as a teenager in Satyajit Ray's Mahanagar (1963), Bachchan's first screen role as an adult was in Guddi (1971), directed by Hrishikesh Mukherjee, with whom she collaborated in several films thereafter. She was noted for her performances in films like Uphaar (1971), Koshish (1972) and Kora Kagaz (1974). She starred alongside Amitabh Bachchan in several films, including Zanjeer (1973), Abhimaan (1973), Chupke Chupke (1975) and Mili (1975). The cult film Sholay (1975) saw her playing the much-lauded role of a young widow.

Following her marriage to Amitabh Bachchan and the birth of their children, she restricted her work in films, notably starring in Nauker (1979) and Silsila (1981). After a 17-year sabbatical, she returned to acting with Govind Nihalani's independent drama Hazaar Chaurasi Ki Maa (1998). She has since played emotionally troubled mothers in the commercially successful dramas Fiza (2000), Kabhi Khushi Kabhie Gham... (2001) and Kal Ho Naa Ho (2003).

Career

Acting career 

Jaya Bachchan is an alumna of the Film and Television Institute of India. She first starred in Satyajit Ray's Bengali film, Mahanagar (1963) at the age of 15, with Anil Chatterjee and Madhabi Mukherjee.She then appeared in two more Bengali films: a 13-minute short Suman, and the comedy Dhanyee Meye (1971), where she played the role of Uttam Kumar's sister-in-law.

Inspired by her experience with Ray, she joined the Film and Television Institute of India (FTII), Pune and graduated with the gold medal. Hrishikesh Mukherjee cast her in Guddi (1971), to play the eponymous role of a petite school-girl obsessed with film star Dharmendra. Guddi was a commercial success, and created the girl-next-door image for her, which she was often associated with through the rest of her career. While she did venture out to play glamorous roles as in Jawani Diwani, (1972) and a semi-negative character of an amnesia-faking heroine in Anamika (1973), she was most recognised for her roles epitomising middle-class sensibility, which she played amiably in films of "middle-cinema" directors such as Gulzar, Basu Chatterjee and indeed Hrishikesh Mukherjee. These films include Uphaar (1971), Piya Ka Ghar (1972), Parichay (1972), Koshish (1972) and Bawarchi (1972). They also made her a superstar.

In Gulzar's Koshish (1973), Bhaduri and Sanjeev Kumar played a deaf couple who struggle through their difficulties as disabled people. She described the film as "a learning experience" which motivated her to do social work in future.

She first acted with Amitabh Bachchan in Bansi Birju (1972), followed by B. R. Ishara's Ek Nazar also in the same year. When Amitabh had faced a string of flops and most lead heroines refused to work with him in the Salim–Javed scripted Zanjeer (1973), she agreed to step in. The film turned out to be a big hit creating Amitabh Bachchan's angry-young-man image. All their successive films as a pair were huge hits - Abhimaan (1973), Chupke Chupke (1975), Mili (1975) and Sholay (1975).

Her daughter Shweta was born around the time Jaya and Amitabh were working on Sholay. Following this, she retired from films and focused on raising her children, making an exception for Yash Chopra's Silsila (1981), once again opposite her husband. During the late 1980s, she wrote the story for Shahenshah (1988), which starred her husband in the lead.

After a gap of 17 years, she returned to acting with Govind Nihalani's Hazaar Chaurasi Ki Maa (1998), a film about the Naxalite movement. In 2000, she starred in Fiza for which she received the Filmfare Award for Best Supporting Actress. She also starred in Karan Johar's ensemble family drama Kabhi Khushi Kabhie Gham... (2001) with her husband. She then starred in Johar's romantic comedy-drama, Kal Ho Naa Ho (2003), playing Preity Zinta's mother, Jennifer Kapur, both of which also earned her the Filmfare Award for Best Supporting Actress. She starred with her son Abhishek in Laaga Chunari Mein Daag (2007) and Drona (2008).

In 2011, she appeared in the Bangladeshi film Meherjaan starring with Victor Banerjee and Humayun Faridi. The film is based on a Bangladesh-Pakistan love story in the backdrop of the 1971 Bangladesh atrocities.

Political career

Bachchan was first elected in 2004 as the Member of Parliament from the Samajwadi Party, representing Uttar Pradesh in the Rajya Sabha till March 2006. She got a second term from June 2006 till July 2010 and in February 2010 she stated her intent to complete her term. She was re-elected in 2012 for the third term and again in 2018 for her fourth term in the Rajya Sabha from Samajwadi Party. Also, she campaigned for All India Trinamool Congress during 2021 West Bengal Legislative Assembly election.
Parliamentary Committee assignments 
 13 September 2021 onwards: Member, Committee on External Affairs

Personal life

Early years and family 

Jaya Bhaduri was born into a Bengali Brahmin family and is the daughter of Taroon Kumar Bhaduri, a journalist, author, and poet and his wife, Indira. She studied at St Joseph's Convent School, Bhopal and graduated from Film and Television Institute of India in Pune.

On 3 June 1973, she married Amitabh Bachchan. The couple have two children: Shweta Bachchan and Abhishek Bachchan, who is also an actor. Shweta is married to industrialist Nikhil Nanda, grandson of the Kapoor family in Delhi, and has two children, Navya Naveli and Agastya Nanda, while Abhishek Bachchan is married to actress Aishwarya Rai, and has a daughter, Aaradhya Bachchan.

Drona speech controversy 
Bachchan's speech during the musical launch of Drona in the second half of 2008 was criticised by some sections of politicians in Maharashtra. In response to the film's director, Goldie Behl, making his introductory speech in English, she said in Hindi, "Hum UP ke log hain, isliye Hindi mein baat karenge, Maharashtra ke log maaf kijiye". (Translation: "We are people from UP, so we will speak in Hindi. People of Maharashtra, please forgive us.") Subsequently, she encouraged actress Priyanka Chopra to speak in Hindi.

Maharashtra Navnirman Sena (MNS) president Raj Thackeray commented that she had no business referring to all the people of Maharashtra in her statement. He threatened to ban all Bachchan films unless she apologised in a public forum for hurting the sentiments of Maharashtrians. MNS workers began to attack theatres screening The Last Lear, which starred her husband. Shiv Sena MP Sanjay Raut also criticised her statement, "After making all your success and fortune in Mumbai, if you feel like saying that we are from UP, it's very unfortunate". Amitabh tendered an apology for her statement on her behalf.

Positions held 
Jaya Bachchan has been elected 4 times as Rajya Sabha MP.

As per the Election affidavit of 2018 (Rajya Sabha), Jaya Bachchan has assets worth ₹1,001.63 crores and liabilities worth ₹105.64 crores.

Awards and recognitions

Civilian Award 
 1992 – Padma Shri – India's fourth highest civilian honour from the Government of India.

Major film awards

Other film awards
Won
 1972 – Bengal Film Journalists' Association Awards – Special Award (Hindi Film) – Guddi
 1999 – Anandalok Awards – Special Editors' Award
 2001 – Bengal Film Journalists' Association Awards – Best Supporting Actress – Fiza
 2001 – Zee Cine Award for Best Supporting Actress – Fiza
 2002 – Sansui Viewers Choice Awards for Best Supporting Actress – Kabhi Khushi Kabhie Gham...

Honours and recognitions 
 1994 – Yash Bharti Award, Uttar Pradesh's highest award from the Government of Uttar Pradesh
 2000 – Mumbai Academy of the Moving Image Award for her "abiding contribution to Cinema"
 2004 – Lifetime Achievement Award at the Sansui Awards
 2010 – Lifetime Achievement Award at the "Tongues On Fire" Film Festival in London
 2012 – Lifetime Achievement Award at Jaipur International Film Festival (JIFF)
 2013 – Master Deenanath Mangeshkar (Vishesh Puraskar) Award for her dedicated services to Indian theatre and cinema

Filmography

Notes

References

External links

 
 Jaya Bachchan at Bollywood Hungama

1948 births
Actresses in Bengali cinema
Loreto College, Kolkata alumni
University of Calcutta alumni
Indian film actresses
Living people
Recipients of the Padma Shri in arts
Indian actor-politicians
Samajwadi Party politicians
Actresses in Hindi cinema
Actresses from Kolkata
Politicians from Kolkata
Rajya Sabha members from Uttar Pradesh
20th-century Bengalis
21st-century Bengalis
Women in Uttar Pradesh politics
21st-century Indian women politicians
21st-century Indian politicians
21st-century Indian actresses
20th-century Indian actresses
Women members of the Rajya Sabha
Jaya
Filmfare Awards winners
Filmfare Lifetime Achievement Award winners
International Indian Film Academy Awards winners
Zee Cine Awards winners
Members of the National Cadet Corps (India)